Rizza may refer to
Rizza (surname)
A frazione of Villafranca di Verona in the province of Verona, Italy
Isola Rizza, a commune in the province of Verona, Italy
Rizza manifold in differential geometry
Rizza Islam (born 1990), member of the Nation of Islam and social media influencer
RZA, an American rapper and record producer (pronounced "rizza")
Riza, a metal covering protecting an icon